|}

The John Smith's Cup (known until 1998 as the Magnet Cup) is a flat handicap horse race in Great Britain open to horses aged three years or older. It is run at York over a distance of 1 mile 2 furlongs and 56 yards (2,063 metres), and it is scheduled to take place each year in July.

It has been sponsored by John Smith's Brewery since its inauguration in 1960, making it the longest running commercial sponsorship in flat racing. Since the Hennessy Gold Cup became the Ladbrokes Trophy it is now the longest running commercial sponsorship in all of British horse racing.

Winners 
 Weights given in stones and pounds.

See also 
 Horse racing in Great Britain
 List of British flat horse races

References

 Paris-Turf: 
Racing Post
,, 

  – John Smith's Cup (ex 'Magnet Cup').

Flat races in Great Britain
Open middle distance horse races
Recurring sporting events established in 1960
York Racecourse
1960 establishments in England